is a passenger railway station located in the city of Takamatsu, Kagawa Prefecture, Japan. It is operated by JR Shikoku and has the station number "T24".

Lines
The station is served by the JR Shikoku Kōtoku Line and is located 6.7 km from the beginning of the line at Takamatsu. Only local services stop at the station.

Layout
Kitachō Station consists of a side platform serving a single track. There is no station building and the station is unstaffed but a shelter is provided on the platform for waiting passengers and a "Tickets Corner" (a small shelter housing an automatic ticket vending machine) is installed. A parking area for bicycles is provided near the station entrance.

History
Japanese National Railways (JNR) opened Kitachō Station on 1 November 1986 as a temporary stop on the existing Kōtoku Line. With the privatization of JNR on 1 April 1987, JR Shikoku assumed control and the stop was upgraded to a full station.

Surrounding area
Takamatsu Municipal Kitakita Elementary School
Takamatsu University
Takamatsu Junior College

See also
List of railway stations in Japan

References

External links

 Station timetable

Railway stations in Kagawa Prefecture
Railway stations in Japan opened in 1986
Railway stations in Takamatsu